Succinea sanctaehelenae is a species of land snail in the family Succineidae, the amber snails. It is known commonly as the blushing snail. It is endemic to the island of Saint Helena in the South Atlantic Ocean.

References

Succineidae
Fauna of Saint Helena Island
Gastropods described in 1830
Taxa named by René Lesson
Taxonomy articles created by Polbot